is an autobahn in northern Germany. It currently connects the cities of Salzgitter, Braunschweig and Wolfsburg, with a planned extension to Lüneburg.

The A 39 begins north of Wolfsburg and ends at the A 7 close to Salzgitter. It crosses the A 2 south of Wolfsburg close to Königslutter.

Exit list

|-

  
 Under construction                                                                                    
|-
|colspan="3"|

 

 

 

/

 

 

|}

External links 

39
A039